Krzysztof Książek (born 5 August 1992) is a Polish classical pianist.

References

External links 
 
 

1992 births
Living people
20th-century Polish people
21st-century Polish musicians
Polish classical pianists
Male classical pianists
Polish musicians
Polish composers
21st-century classical pianists
21st-century male musicians